Battle of the Last Panzer (also known as The Last Panzer Battalion) is a 1969 Spanish-Italian war film directed by José Luis Merino and distributed in America by Troma Entertainment. The film looks through the eyes of the German offense during World War II, specifically a German tank crew who, after losing a battle, struggle to get home.

Cast
 Stan Cooper as Lt. Hunter 
 Erna Schurer as  Jeanette 
 Guy Madison as  Lofty 
 Rubén Rojo as  Sgt. Schultz

References

External links
 

1969 films
Spanish World War II films
Spanish independent films
Troma Entertainment films
Films scored by Angelo Francesco Lavagnino
Macaroni Combat films
1960s Italian films
Italian World War II films